Michelle Collard (born 13 August 1975) is a Canadian former biathlete who competed in the 1998 Winter Olympics. Her nickname is "Tuppy". She carried the Olympic torch 300m on the relay route in Prince George during the 2010 Winter Olympics in Vancouver, Canada.

References

1975 births
Living people
Canadian female biathletes
Olympic biathletes of Canada
Biathletes at the 1998 Winter Olympics